Joseph Thewlis (born 1943), is a male former diver who competed for England and South Africa.

Diving career
Thewlis was a National junior champion before representing England in the 3 metres springboard, at the 1970 British Commonwealth Games in Edinburgh, Scotland.

In 1972 he emigrated to South Africa, where he represented that country in 1975, competing against Rhodesia.

References

1943 births
English male divers
South African male divers
Divers at the 1970 British Commonwealth Games
Living people
Commonwealth Games competitors for England